The Derbent Governorate was a short-lived governorate (guberniya) of the Russian Empire in 1846–1860. 

It was established by the decree of 14 December 1846 of Nicholas I of Russia. In accordance with the "Regulations on the Administration of the Dagestan Oblast" (Положением об управлении Дагестанской областью, 5 April 1860), the Derbent Governorate was abolished, and most of the area became part of the Dagestan Oblast.

References
 Sophie Hohmann, Claire Mouradian, Silvia Serrano, Julien Thorez (eds.), Development in Central Asia and the Caucasus: Migration, Democratisation and Inequality in the Post-Soviet Era, I.B.Tauris, 2014, p. 44, n. 47.

History of Derbent
1860 disestablishments
Governorates of the Russian Empire
States and territories established in 1846
1846 establishments in the Russian Empire